Ismail as-Sadr (died 1919–1920) was a Lebanese Grand Ayatollah, a title which is used in Iran and Iraq referring  to a Twelver Shi'a scholar who is a fully qualified mujtahid who asserts authority over peers and followers by virtue of sufficient study and achievement of the level of necessary competencey needed to obtain permission (ijāza) to practice ijtihad.

Life and Family
Sayyid Ismail as-Sadr is the grandfather of the well-known and respected Sadr family. He is the first to be known with the last name of as-Sadr after his father Sadr ad-Din ibn Salih, whose ancestors had been from the Jabal Amel in Lebanon.

Ismail As-Sadr was born in Isfahan, Iran. He is the youngest of five brothers all of whom became scholars of Shia Islam. He resided in Najaf, Iraq and became the sole marja until his death in 1338 A.H. (ca. 1919–1920). He was survived by: 
Muhammad Mahdi as-Sadr (1879-1939), father of Mohammad al-Sadr (killed 1999), grandfather of Muqtada as-Sadr
Sadr ad-Din as-Sadr (1881-1954), father of Musa as-Sadr (disappeared/killed 1978) and Rabab al-Sadr
Haydar as-Sadr (1891-1937), father of  Muhammad Baqir as-Sadr and Amina al-Sadr (both killed in 1980)
a fourth son.

See also
List of Shi'a Muslim scholars of Islam

References

Sadr, Ismail as-
Sadr, Ismail as-
Iranian people of Lebanese descent
Lebanese ayatollahs
Iraqi Shia Muslims
Al-Moussawi family
1919 deaths
Pupils of Muhammad Kadhim Khorasani